Rekkem is a section of the Belgian city of Menen, in the province of West Flanders. Until 1977, it was an independent municipality. It was called Retchème in Picard. In 1173, the village was still called Rekkem, similar to Reclinghem in Artois and to Rijkegem (Tielt), which were founded by the Viking  Rikiwulf in 876 .

Geography
Rekkem is on the frontier with France and borders Wallonia. It adjoins the localities of Menen, Lauwe, Aalbeke, Mouscron (part of the municipality), Neuville-en-Ferrain and Halluin

The centre of Rekkem is located to the north of the territory while the village of Paradijs is located more to the south.

Languages
The last complete linguistic census of 1947 indicated that over one quarter of the population used French as the "Language exclusively or most frequently spoken".

Roads
The centre of the village is crossed by the N366 (Moeskroenstraat) that connects the centre of Menin and Mouscron. The Lauwestraat and the Priester Coulonstraat, connected to the National, are the link between Rekkem with Lauwe.

The Dronckaertstraat (the former road between Courtrai  and Lille) and the A14 motorway (European route E17)  pass between the centre of Rekkem and the village of Paradijs.

History
In 1963, during the finalisation of the linguistic frontier, the hamlet of Risquons-Tout (0.39 km² - approximately 500 inhabitants) was transferred from the commune of Rekkem to the city of Mouscron.

Culture
The head office of the Flemish cultural association Stichting Ons Erfdeel, as well as the editorial offices of the periodicals Ons Erfdell, Septentrio, The Low Countries and De Franse Nederlanden – Les Pays-Bas Français.

Jozef Deleu, writer and founder of Ons Erfdeel, lives in Rekkem.

Curiosities
The parish church of Rekkem, the church of Saint Nicholas (Sint-Niklaaskerk) was built in the 12th century. It has been a classified monument since 1939.

Populated places in West Flanders